Rostraria cristata, the Mediterranean hairgrass, is an annual grass species  which is native to Eurasia and widely naturalised throughout central and eastern Australia.

References

Pooideae
Plants described in 1753
Taxa named by Carl Linnaeus
Flora of Malta